Brandon Jones (born November 2, 1989) is an American football cornerback who is currently a free agent. He played college football for Rutgers.

Jones grew up in Winslow Township, New Jersey where he earned all state athletic honors. and attended Winslow Township High School.

Professional career

New England Patriots
On May 3, 2013, Jones signed with the New England Patriots as an undrafted free agent. On August 26, 2013, he was cut by the Patriots.

New York Giants
On November 4, 2013, Jones was signed to the New York Giants'  He was released on November 26, 2013.

Pittsburgh Steelers
On December 3, 2013, the Pittsburgh Steelers signed Jones. He was released on December 13, 2013 to clear up roster space for Ross Ventrone.

San Diego Chargers
On December 18, 2013, the San Diego Chargers signed cornerback Brandon Jones He was waived on June 25, 2014 to make room for newly acquired cornerback Brandon Flowers.

Kansas City Chiefs
The Kansas City Chiefs claimed Jones off waivers on June 26, 2014. The Chiefs released Jones on August 25, 2014.

BC Lions
Jones was signed to the BC Lions' on September 30, 2014. He was released by the Lions on November 4, 2014. After that he then had workouts with the Detroit Lions and Atlanta Falcons in 2015

References

External links
New England Patriots bio
New York Giants bio
Pittsburgh Steelers bio
San Diego Chargers bio

Living people
New England Patriots players
New York Giants players
Pittsburgh Steelers players
San Diego Chargers players
Kansas City Chiefs players
1989 births
Rutgers Scarlet Knights football players
Players of American football from New Jersey
People from Winslow Township, New Jersey
Sportspeople from Camden County, New Jersey
Winslow Township High School alumni